Tribunals Ontario is the umbrella organization for 13 adjudicative tribunals under the Ministry of the Attorney General of Ontario. It was formed on January 1, 2019, from the merger of the Social Justice Tribunals Ontario; Environment and Land Tribunals Ontario; and Safety, Licensing Appeals and Standards Tribunals Ontario tribunal "clusters".

Tribunals
Tribunals Ontario consists of the Assessment Review Board, Animal Care Review Board, Child and Family Services Review Board, Custody Review Board, Fire Safety Commission, Human Rights Tribunal of Ontario, Landlord and Tenant Board, Licence Appeal Tribunal, Ontario Civilian Police Commission, Ontario Parole Board, Ontario Special Education Tribunals (separate tribunals for English and French), and Social Benefits Tribunal.

Tribunals are independent, specialized governmental agencies that function at arm's length from government. Tribunals in Canada are subject to judicial review, where a superior court can quash a tribunal's decision if the tribunal exceeds the limits of its statutory authority. In Ontario, decisions by provincial tribunals are subject to review by the Divisional Court branch of the Ontario Superior Court of Justice to determine they are fair, reasonable, and lawful.

References

External links
 

 
2019 establishments in Ontario
Ontario government departments and agencies